Megachile bidentis is a species of bee in the family Megachilidae. It was described by Theodore Dru Alison Cockerell in 1896.

References

Bidentis
Insects described in 1896